Bassareus brunnipes is a species of case-bearing leaf beetle in the family Chrysomelidae. It is found in North America.

References

Further reading

 
 
 
 

Cryptocephalinae
Beetles described in 1791